Darling Companion is a 2012 American comedy-drama film directed by Lawrence Kasdan, written by Kasdan and his wife Meg, and starring Diane Keaton and Kevin Kline. Filming took place in Utah in 2010 and was released on April 20, 2012.

Plot

Beth Winter (Keaton) rescues a lost dog from the roadside and names him Freeway. Her children have grown up and moved away, and her husband, Joseph (Kline), is distracted and self-involved. Beth forms a strong friendship with the dog and is deeply upset when, after her daughter's wedding, her husband loses the dog. They engage the service of a psychic gypsy to find the dog again.

In the end after finally giving up, the family boards an airplane. While flying over the mountains, Beth sees the dog and her husband fakes a ruptured appendix to have the pilot turn the airplane around. In one last attempt at a search, they scour the trees in the area Beth saw the dog, when at last Freeway appears in a field and runs to Beth, reunited at last, bringing the family closer together.

Cast

 Mark Duplass as Bryan Alexander
 Richard Jenkins as Russell
 Diane Keaton as Beth Winter
 Kevin Kline  as Dr. Joseph Winter
 Elisabeth Moss as Grace Winter
 Sam Shepard as Sheriff Morris
 Dianne Wiest as Penny Alexander
 Ayelet Zurer as Carmen
 Jay Ali as Sam

Reception
Darling Companion received mostly negative reviews from critics and was a box-office flop. Rotten Tomatoes gives it a score of 21% based on 89 reviews, with an average rating of 4.46/10. Roger Ebert wrote "It is depressing to reflect on the wealth of talent that conspired to make this inert and listless movie."

References

External links
 
 
 

2012 films
Films directed by Lawrence Kasdan
Films shot in Utah
American independent films
Sony Pictures Classics films
Films scored by James Newton Howard
2012 drama films
American drama films
2012 independent films
2010s English-language films
2010s American films